This is a bibliography of the Scottish comic book writer Grant Morrison.

Comics

UK publishers
Titles published by various British publishers include:
Near Myths (script and art, anthology, Galaxy Media):
 "Time is a Four-Lettered Word" (in #2, 1978)
 "The Vatican Conspiracy" (in #3–4, 1978–1979)
 "The Checkmate Man" (in #5, 1980)
Captain Clyde (script and art, weekly newspaper strip, 1979–1982)
 Distributed via three local Scottish newspapers: Govan Press, Renfrew Press and Clydebank Press.
 Composed of around 150 episodes published between 1 November 1979 to 5 November 1982.
Starblazer (anthology, DC Thomson):
 "Algol the Terrible" (script and art, in #15, 1979)
 "Last Man on Earth" (with Keith Robson, in #28, 1980)
 "Operation Overkill" (with Enrique Alcatena, in #45, 1981)
 "The Cosmic Outlaw" (with José Ortiz, in #86, 1982)
 "The Death Reaper" (with Enrique Alcatena, in #127, 1984)
 "Gateway to Terror" (as inker — on Tony O'Donnell; written by N. Austin, in #142, 1985)
 "Doom World!" (as inker — on Tony O'Donnell; written by Ray Aspden, in #152, 1985)
 "Mind Bender" (with Enrique Alcatena, in #167, 1986)
 "The Midas Mystery" (with Enrique Alcatena, in #177, 1986)
 "The Ring of Gofannon" (with Ricardo Garijo, in #209, 1987)
Warrior #26 + Spring Special: "The Liberators" (with John Ridgway, anthology, Quality Communications, 1985; 1996)
Food for Thought: "Gideon Stargrave in... Famine" (script and art, anthology one-shot, Flying Pig, 1985)
DC London Editions:
Superman: Official 1986 Annual: "Osgood Peabody's Big Green Dream Machine..." (three-page prose story with illustrations by Barry Kitson; 64 pages, 1985)
Batman: Official 1986 Annual: "The Stalking" (three-page prose story with illustrations by Garry Leach; 64 pages, 1985)
Sunrise #1–2: "Abraxas: Prologues I and II" (with Tony O'Donnell, co-feature, Harrier, 1987)
Heartbreak Hotel #4: "Born Again Punk" (script and art, anthology, Willyprods/Small Time Ink, 1988)
The Adventures of Luther Arkwright #10 (one-page illustration, Valkyrie Press, 1989)
Cut (Jul '89–Sep '89): "The New Adventures of Hitler" (with Steve Yeowell, strip in the magazine, Ideas Ltd, 1989)
 Three black-and-white six-page installments of this controversial strip were published before the Cut magazine ceased publication.
 The colored version of the published chapters as well as the continuation of the story were printed in Crisis #46–49 (anthology, Fleetway, 1990)
Trident #1–4: "St. Swithin's Day" (with Paul Grist, anthology, Trident, 1989–1990)
 A colorized version of the story was published as St. Swithin's Day (one-shot, Trident, 1990)
 The black-and-white version was published in the US market as St. Swithin's Day (one-shot, Oni Press, 1998)
A1 #3: "The House of Heart's Desire" (with Dom Regan, anthology, Atomeka, 1990)
Letterbox: "Juliet 4 Romeo" (with Paul Grist, one-page strip in the free giveaway book published by Royal Mail, 1991)
Così Fan Tutte Programme (untitled four-page strip in programme insert, with Cameron Stewart, Scottish Opera, 2001)
The Key (with Rian Hughes, a webcomic commissioned by BBC as part of its Freedom2014 initiative, 2014)
 First published in print as a feature in Heavy Metal #282 (anthology, Heavy Metal Media, 2016)

Marvel UK
Titles published by Marvel UK include:
Captain Britain vol. 2 #13: "Captain Granbretan" (four-page prose story with illustrations by John Stokes, co-feature, 1986)
 Collected in Captain Britain Omnibus (hc, 688 pages, Marvel, 2009)
 Collected in Captain Britain: End Game (tpb, 256 pages, Panini, 2010)
Spider-Man and Zoids (Zoids co-feature — published alongside The Amazing Spider-Man reprints):
 "Old Soldiers Never Die" (with Geoff Senior, in #18, 1986)
 "A Fine and Private Place" (with Geoff Senior, in #19, 1986)
 "Deserts" (with Ron Smith (#30) and Geoff Senior (#31), in #30–31, 1986)
 "Bits and Pieces" (with John Ridgway, in #36–37, 1986)
 "The Black Zoid" (with Kev Hopgood and Steve Yeowell (#43, 45–46), in #40–46, 1986–1987)
 "Orientation" (with Steve Yeowell, in #47, 1987)
 "Out of the Blue" (with Steve Yeowell, in #48, 1987)
 "Blue Moon, Red Dawn" (with Steve Yeowell, in #49, 1987)
 "Schumacher's Story" (with Phil Gascoine, in #50, 1987)
Doctor Who Magazine (anthology):
Doctor Who: The World Shapers (tpb, 288 pages, Panini, 2008) includes:
 "Changes" (with John Ridgway, in #118–119, 1986)
 "The World Shapers" (with John Ridgway, in #127–129, 1987)
Doctor Who: A Cold Day in Hell (tpb, 180 pages, Panini, 2009) includes:
 "Culture Shock" (with Bryan Hitch, in #139, 1988)
Action Force (anthology):
Action Force #17: "Meditations in Red" (with Steve Yeowell, 1987)
Action Force Monthly #3: "Old Scores" (with Mark Farmer, 1988)

Fleetway
Titles published by Fleetway include:
2000 AD (anthology):
Tharg's Future Shocks:
 All-Star Future Shocks (tpb, 192 pages, Simon & Schuster, 2013) includes:
 "Hotel Harry Felix!" (with Geoff Senior, in #463, 1986)
 "The Alteration" (with Alan Langford, in #466, 1986)
 "Alien Aid" (with John Stokes, in #469, 1986)
 "Some People Never Listen!" (with Barry Kitson, in #475, 1986)
 "The Shop That Sold Everything" (with John Stokes, in #477, 1986)
 "Wheels of Fury" (with Geoff Senior, in #481, 1986)
 "Curse Your Lucky Star" (with Barry Kitson, in #482, 1986)
 "Ulysses Sweet: Maniac for Hire" (with Johnny Johnstone, in #507, 1987)
 "Ulysses Sweet in... Fruitcake and Veg" (with Colin MacNeil, in #508–509, 1987)
 "Fair Exchange" (with Colin MacNeil, in #514, 1987)
 "The Invisible Etchings of Salvador Dalí" (with John Hicklenton, in #515, 1987)
 "Big Trouble for Blast Barclay" (with Mike White, in #516, 1987)
 "Return to Sender" (with Jeff Anderson, in Annual '87, 1986)
 The Best of Tharg's Future Shocks (tpb, 160 pages, Rebellion, 2008) includes:
 "2000 BC!" (as "The Mighty One"; with Eric Bradbury, in #473, 1986)
 2000 AD Presents: Sci-Fi Thrillers (tpb, 320 pages, Rebellion, 2013) includes:
 "Danger! Genius at Work!" (with Steve Dillon, in #479, 1986)
 "Candy and the Catchman" (with John Ridgway, in #491, 1986)
Zenith:
 Zenith: Phase One (hc, 112 pages, Rebellion, 2014) collects:
 "Phase One: Tygers" (with Steve Yeowell, in #535–550, 1987)
 "Interlude: Whitlock" (with Steve Yeowell, in #558) and "Interlude: Peyne" (in 559, 1988)
 Zenith: Phase Two (hc, 112 pages, Rebellion, 2014) collects:
 "Phase Two: The Hollow Land" (with Steve Yeowell, in #589–606, 1988)
 "Interlude: Maximan" (with M. Carmona, in Winter Special '88, 1988)
 Zenith: Phase Three (hc, 144 pages, Rebellion, 2015) collects:
 "Mandala: Shadows and Reflections" (with Jim McCarthy, in Annual '90, 1989)
 "Phase Three: War in Heaven" (with Steve Yeowell, in #626–634, 650–662, 667–670, 1989–1990)
 Zenith: Phase Four (hc, 112 pages, Rebellion, 2015) collects:
 "Phase Four: Jerusalem" (with Steve Yeowell, in #791–806, 1992)
 "zzzzenith.com" (with Steve Yeowell, in Prog 2001, 2000)
Venus Bluegenes: "The Pleasures of the Flesh" (with Will Simpson, in Sci-Fi Special '88, 1988) collected in Rogue Trooper: Tales of Nu-Earth Volume 3 (tpb, 400 pages, Rebellion, 2012)
Really and Truly (with Rian Hughes, in #842–849, 1993) collected in Yesterday's Tomorrows (hc, 256 pages, Knockabout, 2007, ; tpb, Image, 2011)
Judge Dredd:
 "Inferno" (with Carlos Ezquerra, in #842–853, 1993) collected in Judge Dredd: The Complete Case Files Volume 19 (tpb, 320 pages, Rebellion, 2012)
 "Book of the Dead" (co-written by Morrison and Mark Millar, art by Dermot Power, in #859–866, 1993) collected in Judge Dredd: The Complete Case Files Volume 20 (tpb, 320 pages, Rebellion, 2013)
 "Crusade" (co-written by Morrison and Mark Millar, art by Mick Austin, in #928–937, 1995) collected in Judge Dredd: The Complete Case Files Volume 22 (tpb, 304 pages, Rebellion, 2014)
Big Dave (co-written by Morrison and Mark Millar):
 "Target: Baghdad" (with Steve Parkhouse, in #842–845, 1993)
 "Monarchy in the UK" (with Steve Parkhouse, in #846–849, 1993)
 "Young Dave" (with Steve Parkhouse, in Yearbook '94, 1993)
 "Costa del Chaos" (with Anthony Williams, in #869–872, 1994)
 "Wotta Lotta Balls" (with Steve Parkhouse, in #904–907, 1994)
Janus: Psi Division:
 "Will o' the Wisp" (with Carlos Ezquerra, in Winter Special '93, 1993)
 "House of Sighs" (co-written by Morrison and Maggie Knight, art by Paul Johnson, in #953, 1995)
 "Faustus" (co-written by Morrison and Mark Millar, art by Paul Johnson, in #1024–1031, 1997)
Tharg the Mighty: "A Night 2 Remember" (with Steve Yeowell, one page in 2000 AD'''s 25th anniversary strip featuring a Zenith cameo, in #1280, 2002)Revolver #1–7: "Dare" (with Rian Hughes, anthology, 1990–1991) — with a short recap strip and the final installment published in Crisis #55–56 (anthology, 1991)
 The entire serial was collected in Yesterday's Tomorrows (hc, 256 pages, Knockabout, 2007, ; tpb, Image, 2011)
 The serial was also reprinted in oversized format as Dare: The Controversial Memoir of Dan Dare (tpb, 80 pages, Xpresso, 1991)Crisis #56–61: "Bible John-A Forensic Meditation" (with Daniel Vallely, anthology, 1991)The Comic Relief Comic (among other writers and artists, one-shot, 1991)

DC Comics
Titles published by DC Comics and its various imprints include:Animal Man (with Chas Truog, Tom Grummett (#9 and 14) and Paris Cullins (#22), 1988–1990) collected as:Volume 1 (collects #1–9, tpb, 240 pages, 1991)Origin of the Species (collects #10–17, tpb, 225 pages, Vertigo, 2002)
 Includes "The Myth of the Creation" short story (art by Tom Grummett) from Secret Origins vol. 2 #39 (anthology, 1989)Deus Ex Machina (collects #18–26, tpb, 232 pages, Vertigo, 2003)Omnibus (collects #1–26 and the short story from Secret Origins vol. 2 #39, hc, 712 pages, Vertigo, 2013)Doom Patrol (with Richard Case, Doug Braithwaite (#25), Kelley Jones (#36), Mike Dringenberg (#42), Steve Yeowell (#43), Vince Giarrano (#45), Ken Steacy (#53), Sean Phillips (#58) and Stan Woch (#59–62), 1989–1993) collected as:Book One (collects #19–34, tpb, 424 pages, Vertigo, 2016)Book Two (collects #35–50, tpb, 448 pages, Vertigo, 2016)Book Three (collects #51–63, tpb, 424 pages, Vertigo, 2017)
 Includes Doom Force Special (written by Morrison, art by Steve Pugh, Ian Montgomery, Richard Case, Paris Cullins, Duke Mighten and Ken Steacy, 1992)Omnibus (collects #19–63 and Doom Force Special, hc, 1,200 pages, Vertigo, 2014)
Batman:Arkham Asylum: A Serious House on Serious Earth (with Dave McKean, graphic novel, hc, 120 pages, 1989, ; sc, 1990)
 A 15th Anniversary Edition of the graphic novel featuring Morrison's original script and story annotations was published as Batman: Arkham Asylum (hc, 216 pages, 2004, ; sc, 2005)
 A 30th Anniversary Edition of the graphic novel with "remastered" artwork was published as Batman: Arkham Asylum (Absolute Edition, 248 pages, 2019, ; sc, 224 pages, DC Black Label, 2020)Batman: Legends of the Dark Knight #6–10: "Gothic" (with Klaus Janson, anthology, 1990) collected as Batman: Gothic (tpb, 96 pages, 1992, ; hc, 144 pages, 2015)Batman (with Andy Kubert, John Van Fleet (#663), Tony Daniel, J. H. Williams III (#667–669), Ryan Benjamin (#675) and Lee Garbett (#682–683), 2006–2009) collected as:
 The Black Glove (collects #655–658, 663–669, 672–675, hc, 384 pages, 2012, ; tpb, 2014)
 The Resurrection of Ra's al Ghul (includes #670–671, hc, 256 pages, 2008, ; tpb, 2009)
 Batman R.I.P. (collects #676–683 and excerpts from DC Universe #0, hc, 192 pages, 2009, ; tpb, 2010)
 Batman by Grant Morrison Omnibus Volume 1 (collects #655–658, 663–683 + story-related excerpts from 52 #30, 47, DC Universe #0 and Final Crisis #1–2, 5–7, hc, 678 pages, 2018)Batman and Robin (with Frank Quitely (#1–3), Philip Tan (#4–6), Cameron Stewart (#7–9, 16), Andy Clarke (#10–12), Dustin Nguyen (#12), Frazer Irving (#13–16) and Chris Burnham (#16), 2009–2011) collected as:
 Batman Reborn (collects #1–6, hc, 168 pages, 2010, ; tpb, 2011)
 Batman vs. Robin (collects #7–12, hc, 168 pages, 2010, ; tpb, 2011)
 Batman and Robin Must Die! (collects #13–16, hc, 168 pages, 2011, ; tpb, 2012)
 Includes the Batman: The Return one-shot (written by Morrison, art by David Finch, 2011)
 Absolute Batman and Robin: Batman Reborn (collects #1–16 and Batman: The Return, hc, 488 pages, 2013)
 Batman by Grant Morrison Omnibus Volume 2 (includes #1–16, hc, 760 pages, 2019)Batman: The Return of Bruce Wayne #1–6 (with Chris Sprouse (#1), Frazer Irving (#2), Yanick Paquette (#3), Georges Jeanty (#4), Ryan Sook + Pere Pérez (#5) and Lee Garbett (#6), 2010)
 Collected as Batman: The Return of Bruce Wayne (hc, 224 pages, 2011, ; tpb, 2012)
 Collected in Batman by Grant Morrison Omnibus Volume 2 (hc, 760 pages, 2019)Batman #700–702 (with Tony Daniel and Frank Quitely + Scott Kolins + Andy Kubert + David Finch (#700), 2010)
 Collected as Batman: Time and the Batman (hc, 128 pages, 2011, ; tpb, 2012)
 Collected in Batman by Grant Morrison Omnibus Volume 2 (hc, 760 pages, 2019)Batman Incorporated (with Yanick Paquette (#1–3, 5), Pere Pérez (#3), Chris Burnham, Scott Clark (#8), Frazer Irving (vol. 2 #0), Andres Guinaldo (vol. 2 #6), Jason Masters  (vol. 2 #7–10) and Andrei Bressan (vol. 2 #10), 2011–2013) collected as:
 Volume 1 (collects #1–8, hc, 264 pages, 2012, ; tpb, 2013)
 Includes the Batman Incorporated: Leviathan Strikes! one-shot (written by Morrison, art by Cameron Stewart and Chris Burnham, 2011)
 Demon Star (collects vol. 2 #0–6, hc, 176 pages, 2013, ; tpb, 2013)
 Gotham's Most Wanted (includes vol. 2 #7–10 and 12–13, hc, 240 pages, 2013, ; tpb, 2014)
 Also collects Batman Incorporated vol. 2 #11 (written by Chris Burnham, drawn by Jorge Lucas, 2013)
 Absolute Batman Incorporated (collects #1–8, vol. 2 #1–13 and Batman Incorporated: Leviathan Strikes!, hc, 648 pages, 2015)
 Batman by Grant Morrison Omnibus Volume 3 (collects #1–8, vol. 2 #1–13, Batman: The Return and Batman Incorporated: Leviathan Strikes!, hc, 688 pages, 2020)Batman: Black and White (unreleased series of graphic novels featuring out-of-continuity stories illustrated by various artists such as Gerard Way, Bill Sienkewicz and Ivan Reis — initially announced in 2015)Arkham Asylum 2 (with Chris Burnham, unreleased graphic novel starring Damian Wayne as the Batman of future Gotham City — initially announced in 2017 but put on hold due to Morrison's other commitments)Detective Comics #1027: "Detective #26" (with Chris Burnham, co-feature, 2020)Secret Origins vol. 2 #46: "Ghosts of Stone" (with Curt Swan, anthology, 1989)Hellblazer #25–26 (with David Lloyd, 1990) collected in John Constantine, Hellblazer Volume 4 (tpb, 288 pages, Vertigo, 2012)Kid Eternity #1–3 (with Duncan Fegredo, 1991) collected as Kid Eternity (tpb, 144 pages, Vertigo, 2006, ; hc, 176 pages, 2015)Fast Forward #1: "A Glass of Water" (with Dave McKean, anthology, Piranha Press, 1992)Aztek, the Ultimate Man #1–10 (co-written by Morrison and Mark Millar, art by N. Steven Harris, 1996–1997) collected as Aztek, the Ultimate Man (tpb, 240 pages, 2008)JLA (with Howard Porter and Óscar Jiménez (#8–9), 1997–2000) collected as:The Deluxe Edition Volume 1 (collects #1–9, hc, 256 pages, 2008, ; tpb, 2012)
 Includes the "Star-Seed" short story (co-written by Morrison and Mark Millar, art by Howard Porter) from JLA Secret Files & Origins #1 (1997)The Deluxe Edition Volume 2 (collects #10–17, hc, 320 pages, 2009, ; tpb, 336 pages, 2012)
 Includes the JLA/WildC.A.T.s one-shot (written by Morrison, art by Val Semeiks, 1997)
 Includes the New Year's Evil: Prometheus one-shot (written by Morrison, art by Arnie Jorgensen, 1998)The Deluxe Edition Volume 3 (collects #22–26 and 28–31, hc, 256 pages, 2010, ; tpb, 344 pages, 2013)
 The hardcover collection also includes JLA #1,000,000, while the paperback version omits both this issue and the two lead-in pages from JLA #23.The Deluxe Edition Volume 4 (includes #34 and 36–41, hc, 368 pages, 2011, ; tpb, 384 pages, 2014)
 The paperback collection also includes fill-in issues penned by other writers, while the hardcover version includes two other related works by Morrison:
 JLA: Earth 2 (with Frank Quitely, graphic novel, hc, 96 pages, 2000, ; sc, 2000)
 JLA: Classified #1–3 (with Ed McGuinness, 2005) also collected as JLA: Ultramarine Corps (tpb, 144 pages, 2007)The Flash vol. 2 (co-written by Morrison and Mark Millar, art by Paul Ryan and Ron Wagner (#137–138), 1997–1998) collected as:Emergency Stop (collects #130–135, tpb, 144 pages, 2009)The Human Race (includes #136–138, tpb, 160 pages, 2009)
 Includes the "Flash of Two Worlds" short story (art by Mike Parobeck) from Secret Origins vol. 2 #50 (anthology, 1990)The Flash by Grant Morrison and Mark Millar (includes #130–138, tpb, 334 pages, 2016)New Gods Secret Files & Origins: "Lost Pages: Orion and Big Barda Join the JLA" (with N. Steven Harris, co-feature in one-shot, 1998)DC One Million Omnibus (hc, 1,080 pages, 2013) includes:DC One Million #1–4 (with Val Semeiks, 1998) also collected as DC One Million (tpb, 208 pages, 1999)DC One Million 80-Page Giant: "The Divided Self" (with Cully Hamner) and "Crisis One Million" (with Dusty Abell, anthology one-shot, 1999)DC Comics Presents: Mystery in Space: "Two Worlds" (with Jerry Ordway, co-feature in one-shot, 2004)Seven Soldiers #0–1 (with J. H. Williams III, 2005 + 2006)
 These two issues served as bookends for a number of interrelated limited series:
 Seven Soldiers: Manhattan Guardian #1–4 (with Cameron Stewart, 2005)
 Seven Soldiers: Shining Knight #1–4 (with Simone Bianchi, 2005)
 Seven Soldiers: Klarion the Witch Boy #1–4 (with Frazer Irving, 2005)
 Seven Soldiers: Zatanna #1–4 (with Ryan Sook, 2005)
 Seven Soldiers: Mister Miracle #1–4 (with Pasqual Ferry (#1) and Freddie Williams II, 2005–2006)
 Seven Soldiers: Bulleteer #1–4 (with Yanick Paquette, 2006)
 Seven Soldiers: Frankenstein #1–4 (with Doug Mahnke, 2006)
 In collected editions, all 30 issues are presented in the original publication order:
 Seven Soldiers of Victory Volume 1 (collects Seven Soldiers #0, Manhattan Guardian #1–4, Shining Knight #1–3, Klarion #1–3, Zatanna #1–3, hc, 400 pages, 2010, ; tpb, 2012)
 Seven Soldiers of Victory Volume 2 (collects Shining Knight #4, Klarion #4, Zatanna #4, Mister Miracle #1–4, Bulleteer #1–4, Frankenstein #1–4, Seven Soldiers #1, hc, 400 pages, 2011, ; tpb, 2012)
 Seven Soldiers by Grant Morrison Omnibus (collects Seven Soldiers #0–1, Manhattan Guardian #1–4, Shining Knight #1–4, Klarion #1–4, Zatanna #1–4, Mister Miracle #1–4, Bulleteer #1–4, Frankenstein #1–4, hc, 792 pages, 2018)
Superman:All-Star Superman #1–12 (with Frank Quitely, DC All-Star, 2006–2008) collected as All-Star Superman (Absolute Edition, 320 pages, 2010, ; tpb, 2011)Action Comics vol. 2 (with Rags Morales, Brent Anderson (#2), Gene Ha (#3 and 9), Andy Kubert (#5–6), Brad Walker, CAFU (#12), Ben Oliver (#0) and Travel Foreman (#13), 2011–2013) collected as:Superman: Action Comics — Superman and the Men of Steel (collects #1–8, hc, 256 pages, 2012, ; tpb, 2013)Superman: Action Comics — Bulletproof (collects #9–12 and 0, hc, 224 pages, 2013, ; tpb, 2013)Superman: Action Comics — At the End of Days (collects #13–18, hc, 224 pages, 2013, ; tpb, 2014)Superman by Grant Morrison Omnibus (collects #0–18, hc, 680 pages, 2021, ; corrected edition, 2021)52 (co-written by Morrison, Greg Rucka, Mark Waid and Geoff Johns, art by Joe Bennett (#1–4, 6, 11, 16, 21, 25, 30, 34, 38, 51), Chris Batista (#5, 10, 17, 20, 29, 31, 40, 45, 52), Ken Lashley (#7), Eddy Barrows (#8, 12, 18, 22, 44, 49, 52), Shawn Moll (#9, 15, 27), Todd Nauck (#11 and 13), Dale Eaglesham (#14 and 25), Pat Olliffe (#19, 25–26, 32, 37, 46, 52), Drew Johnson (#23 and 28), Phil Jimenez (#24–25, 35), Tom Derenick + Joe Prado (#33), Dan Jurgens (#35 and 43), Jamal Igle (#36 and 45), Andy Smith (#39), Giuseppe Camuncoli (#41 and 47), Darick Robertson (#42, 48, 52), Justiniano (#50 and 52) and Mike McKone (#52) from layouts by Keith Giffen, 2006–2007) collected as:Volume 1 (collects #1–13, tpb, 304 pages, 2007)Volume 2 (collects #14–26, tpb, 304 pages, 2007)Volume 3 (collects #27–39, tpb, 304 pages, 2007)Volume 4 (collects #40–52, tpb, 326 pages, 2007)Omnibus (collects #1–52, hc, 1,216 pages, 2012)DCU: Brave New World (anthology one-shot, 2006) featured two segments credited as "based on ideas and concepts developed by Grant Morrison":
 "Uncle Sam and the Freedom Fighters" (co-written by Justin Gray and Jimmy Palmiotti, drawn by Daniel Acuña)
 Continued by the same creative team as Uncle Sam and the Freedom Fighters #1–8 (2006-2007)
 "The All-New Atom" (written by Gail Simone, drawn by John Byrne)
 Continued as The All-New Atom #1–25 (2006-2008)
Wildstorm:Wildcats vol. 4 #1: "A Halo 'Round the World" (with Jim Lee, 2006)
 Issue #2 was solicited but never released; Wildstorm editor Ben Abernathy indicated that Morrison and Lee's stint was planned to run for 6 issues.
 Issue #1, along with Morrison's script for issue #2, was reprinted in Wildstorm: A Celebration of 25 Years (hc, 300 pages, 2017)The Authority vol. 3 #1–2: "Utopian" (with Gene Ha, 2006–2007)
 Three years after issue #2, Wildstorm publshed a continuation of the series, written by Keith Giffen from a plotline by Morrison and Giffen:
 The Authority: The Lost Year #3–12 (drawn by various artists; issues #8–9 are co-written by Giffen and J. M. DeMatteis, 2010)
 Issues #1–2 and The Lost Year #3–7 are collected as The Authority: The Lost Year Book One (tpb, 168 pages, 2010)
 The company-wide crossover storyline "World's End", which launched in 2008, was based on Morrison's original outline for Wildcats and The Authority.Metal Men vol. 3 #1–8 (written and drawn by Duncan Rouleau — each issue of the series featured the credit of "based on ideas and concepts developed by Grant Morrison", 2007–2008)DC Universe #0 (co-written by Morrison and Geoff Johns; art by Ed Benes, George Pérez, Tony Daniel, Aaron Lopresti, Ivan Reis, Philip Tan, J. G. Jones, Doug Mahnke and Carlos Pacheco, one-shot, 2008)Final Crisis (hc, 352 pages, 2009, ; tpb, 2010) and Absolute Final Crisis (hc, 480 pages, 2012) collect:Final Crisis #1–7 (with J. G. Jones, Carlos Pacheco (#4–6), Marco Rudy (#5–6) and Doug Mahnke (#6–7), 2008–2009)Final Crisis: Superman Beyond #1–2 (with Doug Mahnke, 2008–2009)Final Crisis: Submit (with Matthew Clark, one-shot, 2008)The Multiversity #1–2 (with Ivan Reis, 2014–2015)
 These two issues served as bookends for a number of interrelated one-shots:
 The Multiversity: The Society of Super-Heroes (with Chris Sprouse, 2014)
 The Multiversity: The Just (with Ben Oliver, 2014)
 The Multiversity: Pax Americana (with Frank Quitely, 2015)
 The Multiversity: Thunderworld Adventures (with Cameron Stewart, 2015)
 The Multiversity Guidebook (with Marcus To, Paulo Siqueira and various artists, 2015)
 The Multiversity: Mastermen (with Jim Lee, 2015)
 The Multiversity: Ultra Comics (with Doug Mahnke, 2015)
 All nine issues were subsequently collected as The Multiversity (hc, 448 pages, 2015, ; tpb, 2016)
 In 2015, Morrison announced Multiversity Too, a series of graphic novels that would explore various parallel worlds in the DC Multiverse.
 The first in this line of graphic novels, tentatively titled Multiversity Too: The Flash, was announced for late 2016 but never materialized.Wonder Woman: Earth One (with Yanick Paquette, series of graphic novels set in an alternate universe and published under its own imprint):Volume 1 (hc, 144 pages, 2016, ; sc, 2017)Volume 2 (hc, 120 pages, 2018, ; sc, cancelled)Volume 3 (hc, 136 pages, 2021)The Complete Collection (compilation of all three volumes — tpb, 408 pages, 2022)Dark Knights Rising: The Wild Hunt (co-written by Morrison, Scott Snyder, James Tynion IV and Joshua Williamson, art by Howard Porter, Jorge Jiménez and Doug Mahnke, one-shot, 2018)
 Collected in Dark Nights: Metal — Dark Knights Rising (hc, 216 pages, 2018, ; tpb, 2019)
 Collected in Dark Nights: Metal Omnibus (hc, 760 pages, 2023)Sideways Annual #1: "Just Rifting Here" (co-written by Morrison and Dan Didio, art by Will Conrad, 2019) collected in Sideways: Rifts and Revelations (tpb, 208 pages, 2019)The Green Lantern:The Green Lantern (with Liam Sharp and Giuseppe Camuncoli (Annual), 2019) collected as:
 Intergalactic Lawman (collects #1–6, hc, 176 pages, 2019, ; tpb, 2019)
 The Day the Stars Fell (collects #7–12 and Annual #1, hc, 208 pages, 2019, ; tpb, 2020)The Green Lantern Season Two (with Liam Sharp, 2020–2021) collected as:
 Volume 1 (collects #1–6, hc, 248 pages, 2020, ; tpb, 2021)
 Includes the 3-issue spin-off limited series Green Lantern: Blackstars (written by Morrison, art by Xermánico, 2020)
 Ultrawar (collects #7–12, hc, 168 pages, 2021, ; tpb, 2022)Superman and the Authority #1–4 (with Mikel Janín, 2021) collected as Superman and the Authority (hc, 144 pages, 2021, ; tpb, 2022)

Vertigo
Titles published by DC Comics' Vertigo imprint include:Sebastian O #1–3 (with Steve Yeowell, 1993) collected as Sebastian O (tpb, 80 pages, 2004, ; hc, 168 pages, 2017)Swamp Thing vol. 2 #140–143 (co-written by Morrison and Mark Millar, art by Phil Hester, 1994) collected in Swamp Thing: The Root of All Evil (tpb, 296 pages, 2015)The Mystery Play (with Jon J. Muth, graphic novel, hc, 80 pages, 1994, ; sc, 1995)The Invisibles (with Steve Yeowell (#1–4, 22–24, vol. 3 #4–2), Jill Thompson (#5–9, 13–15, vol. 3 #4–3), Chris Weston (#10 + vol. 2 #9, 14–17, 19–22 + vol. 3 #3), John Ridgway (#11 and vol. 3 #4–2), Steve Parkhouse (#12 and vol. 3 #4), Paul Johnson (#16 and 21, vol. 3 #3), Phil Jimenez (#17–19 and vol. 2 #1–13), Tommy Lee Edwards (#20), Mark Buckingham (#25), Michael Lark (vol. 2 #6 and vol. 3 #3), Ivan Reis (vol. 2 #18), Philip Bond (vol. 3 #12–9 and 4), Warren Pleece (vol. 3 #11–9), Sean Phillips (vol. 3 #8–5), Ashley Wood (vol. 3 #4 and 2), Rian Hughes (vol. 3 #3), Cameron Stewart + Pander Brothers + Dean Ormston (vol. 3 #2) and Frank Quitely (vol. 3 #1), 1994–2000) collected as:Book One (collects #1–12, hc, 328 pages, 2014, ; tpb, 2017)
 Includes the "Hexy" short story (art by Duncan Fegredo) from the Absolute Vertigo one-shot (1995)Book Two (collects #13–25, hc, 352 pages, 2014, ; tpb, 2017)
 Includes the "And We're All Police Men" short story (art by Philip Bond) from Vertigo: Winter's Edge #1 (anthology, 1998)Book Three (collects vol. 2 #1–13, hc, 336 pages, 2015, ; tpb, 2018)Book Four (collects vol. 2 #14–22 and vol. 3 #12–1, hc, 512 pages, 2015, ; tpb, 2018)Omnibus (collects #1–25, vol. 2 #1–22, vol. 3 #12–1 and the short stories, hc, 1,536 pages, 2012)Vertigo Voices (umbrella title for a series of one-shots): Kill Your Boyfriend (with Philip Bond, 1995)Bizarre Boys (unproduced one-shot — to be co-written by Morrison with Peter Milligan and drawn by Jamie Hewlett)Flex Mentallo #1–4 (with Frank Quitely, 1996) collected as Flex Mentallo: Man of Muscle Mystery (hc, 112 pages, 2012, ; tpb, 2014)Weird War Tales vol. 2 #3: "New Toys" (with Frank Quitely, anthology, 1997) collected in Graphic Ink: DC Comics Art of Frank Quitely (hc, 368 pages, 2014)The Filth #1–13 (with Chris Weston, 2002–2003) collected as The Filth (tpb, 320 pages, 2004, ; hc, 2015)LeSexy (with Cameron Stewart, unproduced 6-issue limited series — initially announced in 2002, the project was ultimately rejected by Vertigo editor Karen Berger)Indestructible Man (with Frank Quitely, unproduced series described by Morrison as "the third part of an informal "hypersigil" trilogy including The Invisibles and The Filth")
 In 2004, Morrison stated this project was put on the back burner as "Flex Mentallo, The Invisibles and The Filth already formed the cohesive "hypersigil" trilogy".Seaguy (with Cameron Stewart):Seaguy #1–3 (2004) collected as Seaguy (tpb, 104 pages, 2005)Seaguy: The Slaves of Mickey Eye #1–3 (2009)Seaguy: Eternal (final part of the trilogy, initially announced in 2008 — Morrison reportedly completed the scripts in 2014)We3 #1–3 (with Frank Quitely, 2004–2005) collected as We3 (tpb, 104 pages, 2005, ; hc, 144 pages, 2011)Vimanarama #1–3 (with Philip Bond, 2005) collected as Vimanarama (tpb, 104 pages, 2006, ; hc, 144 pages, 2016)Warcop (with Sean Murphy, unreleased 6-issue limited series — initially announced in 2008 but abandoned in favor of The New Bible and Joe the Barbarian)The New Bible (with Camilla d'Errico — initially announced in 2009 as a reworking of the unreleased Warcop project, last mentioned by d'Errico in a 2011 interview)Joe the Barbarian #1–8 (with Sean Murphy, 2010–2011) collected as Joe the Barbarian (hc, 224 pages, 2011, ; tpb, 2013)

Marvel Comics
Titles published by Marvel include:Skrull Kill Krew #1–5 (co-written by Morrison and Mark Millar, art by Steve Yeowell, 1995) collected as Skrull Kill Krew (tpb, 128 pages, 2006)Marvel Boy vol. 2 #1–6 (with J. G. Jones, Marvel Knights, 2000–2001) collected as Marvel Boy (tpb, 144 pages, 2001, ; hc, 160 pages, 2008)New X-Men (with Frank Quitely, Leinil Francis Yu (Annual), Ethan Van Sciver (#117–118, 123, 133), Igor Kordey, John Paul Leon (#127 and 131), Phil Jimenez, Keron Grant (#134), Chris Bachalo (#142–145) and Marc Silvestri (#151–154), 2001–2004) collected as:Ultimate Collection: New X-Men Volume 1 (collects #114–126 and Annual '01, hc, 384 pages, 2002, ; tpb, 2008)Ultimate Collection: New X-Men Volume 2 (collects #127–141, hc, 368 pages, 2003, ; tpb, 2008)Ultimate Collection: New X-Men Volume 3 (collects #142–154, hc, 336 pages, 2004, ; tpb, 2008)New X-Men Omnibus (collects #114–154 and Annual '01, hc, 992 pages, 2006)Fantastic Four: 1 2 3 4 (hc, 120 pages, 2011) collects:Fantastic Four: 1 2 3 4 #1–4 (with Jae Lee, Marvel Knights, 2001–2002) also collected as Fantastic Four: 1 2 3 4 (tpb, 96 pages, 2002)Marvel Knights Double Shot #2: "Nick's World" (with Manuel Gutiérrez, anthology, 2002)All-New Miracleman Annual: "October Incident: 1966" (with Joe Quesada, co-feature, 2015) collected in Miracleman: Olympus (hc, 328 pages, 2015)
 Morrison originally penned this short story in the mid-80s for Quality Communications' ongoing Miracleman feature in the Warrior magazine, then-written by Alan Moore.
 The script was rejected at the insistence of Moore and remained unused until Marvel acquired the rights to the character and began publishing Miracleman stories.

Other US publishers
Titles published by various American publishers include:
Eclipse:Steed and Mrs. Peel #1–3: "The Golden Game" (with Ian Gibson, 1990–1991) collected in Steed and Mrs. Peel: The Golden Game (tpb, 160 pages, Boom! Studios, 2012)Born to be Wild: "Dominion" (two versions of the same script — one illustrated by Daniel Vallely and the other by Tony Akins, anthology graphic novel, 80 pages, 1991)
Image:Spawn #16–18: "Reflections" (with Greg Capullo, Todd McFarlane Productions, 1993–1994)
 Collected in Spawn: Origins Collection Volume 3 (tpb, 160 pages, 2009)
 Collected in Spawn: Origins Collection Book Two (hc, 328 pages, 2010)Happy! #1–4 (with Darick Robertson, 2012–2013) collected as Happy! (tpb, 96 pages, 2013, ; hc, 128 pages, 2013)Nameless #1–6 (with Chris Burnham, 2015) collected as Nameless (hc, 192 pages, 2016, ; tpb, 2017)Vampirella Monthly (Harris):Vampirella: The Morrison/Millar Collection (tpb, 176 pages, 2006) collects:
 Vampirella 25th Anniversary Special: "Blood Red Game" (with Michael Bair, anthology, 1996)
 "Ascending Evil" (co-written by Morrison and Mark Millar, art by Amanda Conner, in #1–3, 1997)
 "Holy War" (co-plotted by Morrison and Mark Millar; written by Steven Grant, drawn by Louis Small, Jr., in #4–6, 1997)
 "The Queen's Gambit" (co-plotted by Morrison and Mark Millar; written by Steven Grant, drawn by Amanda Conner, in #7–9, 1997)
Dynamite:18 Days (story bible and scripts for the unproduced Virgin web project MBX with illustrations by Mukesh Singh, 120 pages, 2010)
 After the dissolution of Virgin (subsequently renamed Liquid), its owners started a new company, Graphic India, and published an ongoing series based on Morrison's story bible and completed scripts:
 Grant Morrison's 18 Days #1–21 (written by Sharad Devarajan, Gotham Chopra, Samit Basu, Ashwin Pande and Sarwat Chadda, drawn by Jeevan Kang, Francesco Biagini, Saumin Patel and Ronilson Freire, 2015–2017)
 Graphic India also published a Morrison-written limited series that was partially serialized as a digital comic via Humble Bundle before its print release: Avatarex #1–4 (with Jeevan Kang (#1) and Edison George, 2016–2017)Dinosaurs vs. Aliens (script by Morrison based on the concept by Barry Sonnenfeld, art by Mukesh Singh, graphic novel, 96 pages, 2012)Captain Victory and the Galactic Rangers vol. 3 #6 (as artist — among others; written by Joe Casey, 2015) collected in Captain Victory and the Galactic Rangers (tpb, 168 pages, 2016)Annihilator #1–6 (with Frazer Irving, Legendary, 2014–2015) collected as Annihilator (hc, 200 pages, 2015)Sinatoro (with Vanesa del Rey, unreleased series intended for publication by Black Mask Studios, initially announced for April 2015, then late 2016)Prometheus Eternal: "Prometheus is Here!" (with Farel Dalrymple, anthology one-shot, Locust Moon Press, 2015)
Boom! Studios:Klaus (with Dan Mora):
 Klaus #1–7 (2015–2016) collected as Klaus: How Santa Claus Began (hc, 208 pages, 2016, ; tpb, 2019)
 Klaus: The New Adventures of Santa Claus (hc, 128 pages, 2018, ; tpb, 2021) collects:
 Klaus and the Witch of Winter (one-shot, 2016)
 Klaus and the Crisis in Xmasville (one-shot, 2017)
 Klaus: The Life and Times of Santa Claus (hc, 128 pages, 2021) collects:
 Klaus and the Crying Snowman (one-shot, 2018)
 Klaus and the Life and Times of Joe Christmas (one-shot, 2019)Proctor Valley Road #1–6 (co-written by Morrison and Alex Child, art by Naomi Franquiz, 2021) collected as Proctor Valley Road (tpb, 144 pages, 2021)Love is Love (two-page illustration devised by Morrison and drawn by Jesús Merino, anthology graphic novel, 144 pages, IDW Publishing, 2016)Heavy Metal #280–292 (as Editor-in-Chief) — #293–294 (as "advisor") — #295 (as "creative advisor", anthology, Heavy Metal Media, 2016–2019)
 In addition to the editorial duties, Morrison also penned a number of short stories and serials for the magazine:
 "Beachhead" (with Benjamin Marra, in #280–281, 2016)
 "Option 3" (with Simeon Aston, in #281, 2016)
 "Industria and the Toilet That Traveled Through Time" and "The Key" (with Rian Hughes, in #282, 2016)
 "The Smile of the Absent Cat" (with Gerhard, in #283 + 286 + 292 + 294 + 296, 2016–2019)
 The sixth and final chapter, although completed, was not published for undisclosed legal reasons.
 A collected edition was solicited for a 2021 release but subsequently cancelled: The Smile of the Absent Cat (hc, 48 pages, ; tpb)
 "The Savage Sword of Jesus Christ" (with Molen brothers, in #284 and 290, 2017–2018)
 The story was originally developed by Morrison in the mid-00s as a sequel to The New Adventures of Hitler; only two out of six planned episodes were published.
 A collected edition was solicited for a 2019 release but subsequently cancelled: The Savage Sword of Jesus Christ (hc, 48 pages)
 "Mythopia" (with Andy Belanger, in #285, 2017)
 "New Madonna" (with Menton J. Matthews III, in #288, 2017)
 Issue #288 also featured a reprint of the short story "The House of Heart's Desire" with art by Dom Regan.
 The story, originally published in A1 #3 (Atomeka, 1990), was reprinted with new coloring and lettering.
 "Ten Sounds That Represent a Kind of Person: A Historical Parody" (with Benjamin Marra, in #289, 2017)
 "Nihilophilia" (with Tula Lotay, in #291, 2018)
 "The Rise and Fall of Empires" (with Rian Hughes, in #292, 2018)
Ahoy Comics:The Wrong Earth #1: ""Hud" Hornet's Holiday in Hell!" (three-page prose story with illustrations by Rob Steen, 2018)High Heaven #1: "Festive Funtimes at the New World's Fair!" (three-page prose story with illustrations by Rick Geary, 2018)Captain Ginger #1: "The Electric Sky Bear That Inspired Ben Franklin!" (two-page prose story with illustrations by Phil Hester, 2018)Anthrax: Among the Living: "Indians" (with Freddie Williams II, anthology graphic novel, 120 pages, Z2 Comics, 2021)

Prose fiction and playwriting
Most of Morrison's early non-comics work was reprinted in a single volume:

Further short- and long-form prose works include:Skin Two #26: "The Story of Zero" (short story — written to accompany photos by Alexander Brattell created under the art direction of Steven Cook, 1998)Songs of the Black Wurm Gism: "Luvkraft v. Kthulhu" (short story for the book of H. P. Lovecraft tributes, 356 pages, Creation Oneiros Books, 2009)
 The short story is based on a transcript of the spoken word performance staged for the Lovecraft Lives event (held at Waterstone's in Manchester on 6 August 1999)Luda: A Novel (448 pages, Del Rey, 2022)

Nonfiction and other workARK #25–26, 28–29 (short reviews of contemporary comics, Titan, 1988–1989)Speakeasy #101–119: "Drivel" (opinion column in the comics magazine, John Brown Publishing, 1989–1991)
 A one-off installment titled "Son of Drivel: From My Pulpit" was published in Tripwire #3 (Tripwire, 1992)Rapid Eye Volume 3: "In Search of Maya Deren" (biographical piece for the book of essays, 256 pages, Creation Books, 1995)Sleazenation: "The Smell of Reason" (irregular column — only three (heavily edited) installments were published, Swinstead Publishing, 1998–2000)Malaparte: A House Like Me: "Unbuilding Malaparte" (short prose piece for the book about Casa Malaparte, 200 pages, Clarkson Potter, 2000)Fortune Hotel: "It was the 90s" (short piece detailing Morrison's Kathmandu experience for the book of travelogues, 320 pages, Penguin, 2000)Come Ride My Column (irregular column published via an older version of Morrison's website, 2000–2002)Book of Lies: The Disinformation Guide to Magick and the Occult: "Pop Magic!" (essay for the magic-themed book, 352 pages, Disinfo, 2003)
 A revised and expanded version of this essay was published under the title "Beyond the World and the Fool" in Heavy Metal #286 (Heavy Metal Media, 2017)Supergods (part autobiography, part analysis of the history of superheroes) published under two different subtitles:
 Published in the UK, EU and Commonwealth countries (excluding Canada) by Jonathan Cape as Supergods: Our World in the Age of the Superhero (hc, 480 pages, 2011, ; sc, 2012)
 Published in the US by Spiegel & Grau as Supergods: What Masked Vigilantes, Miraculous Mutants, and a Sun God from Smallville Can Teach Us About Being Human (hc, 480 pages, 2011, ; sc, 2012)Heavy Metal #280–285, 287–292 (editorials in the comics magazine, Heavy Metal Media, 2016–2018)Xanaduum: The Project of a Lifetime (newsletter published via Substack, 2022–ongoing)

Works about Morrison
 Neighly, Patrick and Cowe-Spigai, Kereth. Anarchy for the Masses: The Disinformation Guide to the Invisibles. Disinfo, 2003.
 Rauch, Stephen. "'We Have All Been Sentenced': Language as Means of Control in Grant Morrison's Invisibles." International Journal of Comic Art vol. 6 #2 (pp 350–363), 2004.
 Niederhausen, Michael. "Deconstructing Crisis on Infinite Earths: Grant Morrison's Animal Man, JLA: Earth 2, and Flex Mentallo." International Journal of Comic Art vol. 8 #1 (pp 271–282), 2006.
 Verano, Frank. "Invisible Spectacles, Invisible Limits: Grant Morrison, Situationist Theory, and Real Unrealities." International Journal of Comic Art vol. 8 #2 (pp 319–329), 2006.
 Callahan, Timothy. Grant Morrison: The Early Years. Sequart, 2007.
 Meaney, Patrick. Our Sentence is Up: Seeing Grant Morrison's The Invisibles. Sequart, 2009.
 Meaney, Patrick (director). Grant Morrison: Talking with Gods. Respect! Films and Sequart, 2010. Documentary film.
 Singer, Marc. Grant Morrison: Combining the Worlds of Contemporary Comics. University Press of Mississippi, 2011.
 Shapira, Tom. Curing the Postmodern Blues: Reading Grant Morrison and Chris Weston's The Filth in the 21st Century. Sequart, 2013.
 Walker, Cody. The Anatomy of Zur-en-Arrh: Understanding Grant Morrison's Batman''. Sequart, 2014.

References

External links

Grant Morrison at Barney

Grant Morrison bibliography at Enrojas World

Bibliographies of British writers
Science fiction bibliographies
Bibliographies by writer
Lists of comics by creator